Banavan may refer to:
 Banavan, Fars (بنوان - Banavān)
 Banavan, Kurdistan (بانوان - Bānavān)